William Dennis Shea (7 February 1924 - 22 September 1982) was a Welsh cricketer. He was a right-handed batsman who bowled right-arm leg break googly.

Born at Briton Ferry, Glamorgan, Shea made his first-class debut for Glamorgan in the 1947 County Championship against Warwickshire. He played 1 further first-class match in the 1947 against Northamptonshire and played his final first-class match in 1948 against the Combined Services.

In his 3 first-class matches, he scored 27 runs at a batting average of 13.50, with a top score of 18*. With the ball he took 5 wickets at a bowling average of 36.00, with best figures 4/68.

Death
Dennis Shea died at Ormskirk, Lancashire, aged 58, on 22 September 1982.

Family
His uncle Alf Shea played 621 first-class matches for Glamorgan in 1928.

References

External links
Dennis Shea at Cricinfo
Dennis Shea at CricketArchive

1924 births
1982 deaths
Cricketers from Briton Ferry
Welsh people of Irish descent
Welsh cricketers
Glamorgan cricketers